Joseph Royal (7 May 1837 – 23 August 1902) was a Canadian journalist, lawyer, politician, businessman, and Lieutenant Governor of the Northwest Territories.

Early life and career
Royal studied at St. Mary's Jesuit college in Montreal. His early publishing career included a term as editor of Montreal's Minerve from 1857 to 1859. He then founded and published other Montreal-based publications such as  L'Ordre (1859–1860), La Revue Canadienne (1864) and Le Nouveau Monde (1867, editor-in-chief). Soon after moving to Manitoba, Royal founded Le Metis and operated that publication from 1871 to 1882 after which its new owner changed its title to Le Manitoba.

His legal career began in Lower Canada where he was called to that province's bar in 1864. He joined the Manitoba bar in 1871 after moving to that province. In 1880, Royal left legal practice.

Political career
In the 1870 Manitoba provincial elections, he was acclaimed to the Legislative Assembly of Manitoba for the riding St François Xavier West, and in 1871 he was unanimously chosen speaker. From 1874 to 1876, he was the Provincial Secretary and Minister of Public Works. From 1876 to 1878, he was the Attorney General. In 1878, he was the Minister of Public Works.

In an 1879 by-election, he was elected to the House of Commons of Canada representing the Manitoba riding of Provencher. A Conservative, he was re-elected in 1882 and 1887.

Royal was appointed to, and served as a member on the Temporary North-West Council, the first legislature of the Northwest Territories from 1872 to 1876. He would later serve as the Lieutenant Governor of the Northwest Territories from 1888 to 1893.

Later life
In December 1894, Royal returned to La Minerve where he became editor-in-chief. After publishing other books, he died in Montreal in 1902.

Works
 Vie Politique de Sir Louis H Lafontaine (1864)
 La Vallée de la Mantawa (Montreal, 1869)
 Le Canada, république ou colonie? (Montreal, 1894)
 Histoire du Canada 1841 à 1867 (Montreal, 1909) – published after death

Electoral history

References

External links

 The Honourable Joseph Royal, 1888–93 at the Legislative Assembly of Alberta

1837 births
1902 deaths
Members of the House of Commons of Canada from Manitoba
Conservative Party of Canada (1867–1942) MPs
Speakers of the Legislative Assembly of Manitoba
Members of the Legislative Assembly of the Northwest Territories
Progressive Conservative Party of Manitoba MLAs
Lieutenant Governors of the Northwest Territories
Members of the Executive Council of Manitoba
People from Repentigny, Quebec
Canadian Roman Catholics
Burials at Notre Dame des Neiges Cemetery